Glenn Bogue (born 30 August 1955) is a Canadian sprinter. He competed in the men's 400 metres at the 1976 Summer Olympics. He won a bronze medal in the 4 x 400 metres relay at the 1975 Pan American Games. In the 400 metres at the 1979 Pan American Games, Bogue finished eighth. He won a bronze medal in the 400 metres at the 1978 Commonwealth Games.

References

1955 births
Living people
Athletes (track and field) at the 1976 Summer Olympics
Canadian male sprinters
Olympic track and field athletes of Canada
Athletes (track and field) at the 1975 Pan American Games
Athletes (track and field) at the 1979 Pan American Games
Pan American Games bronze medalists for Canada
Pan American Games medalists in athletics (track and field)
Athletes (track and field) at the 1978 Commonwealth Games
Commonwealth Games bronze medallists for Canada
Commonwealth Games medallists in athletics
Athletes from Toronto
Medalists at the 1975 Pan American Games
Medallists at the 1978 Commonwealth Games